The Seattle Thunderbirds are a major junior ice hockey team based in the city of Kent, Washington, south of Seattle. They are part of the U.S. Division of the Western Conference in the Western Hockey League. They play their games at home in accesso ShoWare Center.

History
The team was founded in 1971 as the Vancouver Nats of the Western Canada Hockey League (WCHL) but moved to Kamloops, British Columbia, to become the Kamloops Chiefs in 1973.

In 1977 the team moved to Seattle and was renamed the Seattle Breakers.  The Breakers played in the Seattle Center Ice Arena, which had a seating capacity of 4,141 for ice hockey. Through eight seasons, the Breakers finished with a regular season record of 225 wins, 319 losses, and 32 ties; and playoff record of 11 wins and 21 losses, although they twice played in the West Division Finals.

Modern era
In 1982 the Breakers acquired future NHL great Ken Daneyko from the Spokane Chiefs. They made the playoffs and lost in the Divisional final.

After the 1984–85 season, the Breakers were sold to new owners and renamed the Seattle Thunderbirds.

The 1986–87 season saw the addition of Glen Goodall, who would remain with the team through 1990.  Goodall would go on to set the Western Hockey League career records for most games played (399), goals scored (262), assists (311) and points (573).  He is still the Thunderbirds leader in goals, assists and points.  His jersey, number 10, is the only one to be retired by the Thunderbirds.

The 1989–90 season was the best regular season in Thunderbird history, and arguably the greatest team the franchise has ever iced. Seattle finished the season at 52–17–3, which included a 44–8–3 record in their final 55 and the #1 ranking in the final Canadian Hockey League Regular Season Top Ten poll. The team finished 33–2–1 at home tying a WHL record for most home wins. Goodall won the Most Valuable Player award finishing with 76 goals and 87 assists for 163 points, and Petr Nedvěd won Rookie of the Year. Seattle placed three scorers in the top six in the league: Goodall was second with 163 points, Victor Gervais third with 160 points and Nedved sixth with 145 points. Peter Kasowski came over in a trade from Swift Current and finished 13th with 129 points. Goaltender Danny Lorenz finished his career with a WHL record most career saves and minutes played. The team was so popular that they began to play many home games in the Seattle Center Coliseum, which could seat almost 12,000 for hockey and was frequently sold out. The T-Birds defeated the Tri-City Americans 5 games to 2 in the division semifinals, before losing to the eventual Western Hockey League champion Kamloops Blazers 5 games to 1 in the division finals.

In 1992, the Thunderbirds hosted the Canadian Hockey League championship, the Memorial Cup. In the opening game, the T-Birds beat Verdun Collège Français 5–3, thanks to a hat trick by George Zajankala. After losses to the Sault Ste. Marie Greyhounds 4-3 and Kamloops 3–1, they finished third in the round-robin and faced eventual champions Kamloops again in the semifinal by an 8–3 score.

The 1996–97 team, led by Patrick Marleau, finished the season with a record of 41–27–4. They won the Western Conference by beating the Prince George Cougars 4 games to 2. Seattle was beaten by Lethbridge 4 games to 0 in the WHL championship series.

The 2002–03 season saw the team advance to the conference finals on the back of Brooks Laich, who was named the Western Conference MVP with 41 goals and 94 points. After convincing wins in the early rounds of the playoffs, the Thunderbirds lost to the Kelowna Rockets four games to one.

The 2015–16 season was a breakout season for the Thunderbirds, and was one of the most successful seasons in franchise history. During the season, the Thunderbirds clinched the U.S. Division after a 4–1 win over the Spokane Chiefs on March 15. This was Seattle's third division championship in team history and first since the 2004–05 season. Seattle also finished the regular season with the second most wins in team history (45). In the quarterfinal round of the 2015-2016 WHL Playoffs, the Thunderbirds swept the Prince George Cougars, 4 games to 0, and advanced to the semifinal round against the Everett Silvertips, where the Thunderbirds dominated the Silvertips, winning the series 4 games to 1. With the win, they advanced to the Western Conference Finals against the Kelowna Rockets, the defending WHL Champions. Once again, the Thunderbirds continued their dominant playoff run, as they swept the series against the Rockets, 4 games to 0. The series-clinching win came in a double-overtime thriller as rookie Matt Wedman scored the game-winning goal halfway through the second overtime to give the Thunderbirds the 5–4 overtime victory, clinching the Western Conference championship. With the win, the Thunderbirds advanced to the WHL Championship for the first time since 1996–97. The Thunderbirds faced the Brandon Wheat Kings in the league final and lost the series 4–1. The finals with Brandon was much closer than the end result, as the first three games were decided in overtime and all three ending with Wheat King victories.

The Thunderbirds did not have to wait long for their next shot at a league championship. Although they did not repeat as division champions the following season, Seattle finished the regular season with the second most wins in team history (46), topping their record from the previous season. In the quarterfinal round of the 2016-2017 WHL playoffs, the Thunderbirds swept the Tri-City Americans, 4 games to 0, and advanced to the semifinal round for a rematch with Everett. The Thunderbirds continued their postseason domination of the Silvertips, sweeping the series 4 games to 0 to advance to the Western Conference Finals and yet another rematch with Kelowna. Although this series did not end in a sweep in Seattle's favor like the previous year, the Thunderbirds still prevailed over the Rockets, 4 games to 2. With the win, the Thunderbirds advanced to the WHL Championship for the second straight year, this time against the Regina Pats. Unlike their previous two league final appearances, the Thunderbirds broke through and won their first-ever league championship, taking the series 4–2. The series-clinching win in Game 6 at the Brandt Centre came in an overtime thriller after the Thunderbirds rallied from a late two-goal deficit to force overtime with 2:54 remaining in the third period. Alexander True scored the game-winning goal midway through the first overtime period to give the Thunderbirds the 4–3 victory, clinching the Championship and sending the team to their second Memorial Cup appearance in team history and first as WHL champions.

Arenas
The Thunderbirds originally played at Mercer Arena, then split time between Mercer Arena and the Seattle Center Coliseum beginning in the 1989–90 season. When the Coliseum was renovated into KeyArena, the Thunderbirds returned, but KeyArena's post-renovation configuration was designed for basketball and featured an off-center ice sheet. Many seats in the lower level were obstructed, leading to much of the lower level being curtained off.

Due to growing fan and team dissatisfaction with KeyArena, in 2009, the Thunderbirds moved to ShoWare Center, 20 miles south in Kent, where they became the anchor tenant. The Thunderbirds have a large fan base, and continually draw some of the highest attendance numbers in the WHL on a yearly basis at the ShoWare Center.

Logo and uniforms
The team's logo depicts a Native American carving of a thunderbird with the word "Seattle" etched into it, framed by two hockey sticks. It is similar to the logo and colors of the Seattle Seahawks of the National Football League.

Their uniforms are very similar to those of the Hartford Whalers from 1992 to 1997.

Season-by-season record
Note: GP = Games played, W = Wins, L = Losses, T = Ties OTL = Overtime losses Pts = Points, GF = Goals for, GA = Goals against

WHL championship history
1996–97: Loss, 0–4 vs Lethbridge
2015–16: Loss, 1–4 vs Brandon
2016–17: Win 4–2 vs Regina
2021–22: Loss 2–4 vs Edmonton
 WHL championship overall record: 7 - 14

Current roster
Updated February 5, 2023.

 

 

 

 
 

 
 

 
 

  
 
 
 
  

 
 

 
 

  

|}

Team records

Career records
Most goals, individual: 262 – Glen Goodall, 1984–90
Most assists, individual: 311 – Glen Goodall, 1984–90
Most points, individual: 573 – Glen Goodall, 1984–90
Most penalty minutes, individual: 929 – Phil Stanger, 1980–83
Best goals against average, goaltender: 2.28 – Bryan Bridges, 2003–06
Most shutouts, goaltender: 20 – Bryan Bridges, 2003–06
Most saves, goaltender: 7727 – Calvin Pickard, 2008–12
Most games played, Goaltender: 241 – Calvin Pickard, 2008–12

NHL alumni

Several National Hockey League players started with the Thunderbirds:

Glenn Anderson
Doug Barrault
Mathew Barzal
Ethan Bear
Matt Berlin
Rick Berry
Zdenek Blatny
Lonny Bohonos
Landon Bow
Jim Camazzola
Shawn Chambers
Ben Clymer
Ken Daneyko
Kimbi Daniels
Brenden Dillon
Peter Dineen
Steve Dykstra
Craig Endean
Shane Endicott
Brennan Evans
Brent Fedyk
Zack Fitzgerald
Wade Flaherty
Aaron Gagnon
Steven Goertzen
Stanislav Gron
Dylan Guenther
Barrett Heisten
Riku Helenius
Chris Herperger
Matt Hervey
Thomas Hickey
Bud Holloway
Jan Hrdina
Tim Hunter
Jamie Huscroft
Scott Jackson
Chris Joseph
Mike Kennedy
Alan Kerr
Jon Klemm
Rob Klinkhammer
Keegan Kolesar
John Kordic
Brent Krahn
Greg Kuznik
Brooks Laich
John Lilley
Danny Lorenz
Dwayne Lowdermilk
Brian Lundberg
Jamie Lundmark
Stewart Malgunas
Patrick Marleau
Glenn Merkosky
Tomas Mojzis
David Morisset
Petr Nedved
Jim O'Brien
Chris Osgood
Mark Parrish
Ed Patterson
Lane Pederson
Calvin Pickard
Jame Pollock
Deron Quint
Errol Rausse
Jeremy Reich
Scott Robinson
Cody Rudkowsky
Oleg Saprykin
Cory Sarich
Chris Schmidt
Andy Schneider
Corey Schwab
Brent Severyn
Mike Siklenka
Trevor Sim
Matthew Spiller
Turner Stevenson
Austin Strand
Garret Stroshein
Rob Tallas
Shea Theodore
Nate Thompson
Denis Tolpeko
Alexander True
Lindsay Vallis
Wayne Van Dorp
Ryan Walter
Joe Ward
Chris Wells
David Wilkie
Mitch Wilson
Brendan Witt
Dody Wood
Brad Zavisha

See also
Thunderbird (mythology)
Seattle Totems

References

External links
Seattle Thunderbirds official homepage
Seattle Hockey History

1977 establishments in Washington (state)
Ice hockey clubs established in 1977
Ice hockey in Seattle
Ice hockey teams in Washington (state)
Sports in Kent, Washington
Western Hockey League teams